Tilda Uganda Limited is a rice growing and processing company in the Eastern Region of Uganda.

Location
The coordinates of the company headquarters and factory are 0°32'06.0"N, 33°52'31.0"E (Latitude:0.535005; Longitude:33.875280).

Overview
The Kibimba Rice Scheme, was established by President Idi Amin with China in 1973. In 1996, Tilda Limited acquired the property. They applied to the International Finance Corporation for a US$2 million loan, as part of the funding required to rehabilitate the estate for growing, manufacturing, marketing and distribution of rice and rice products. It is estimated that in 2011, Tilda Uganda Limited was producing about 20,000 metric tonnes of refined rice grain annually.

Ownership
TUL is a wholly owned subsidiary of Tilda Limited, a rice and related food products company headquartered in Rainham, (England), with offices in Dubai, (UAE) and Delhi (India).

Other considerations
Some of the members of the family that founded Tilda Limited, were born or lived in Uganda for part of their lives.

See also

References

External links
 Website of Tilda Limited - The Parent Company
 How a bad deal led to better opportunity

Companies established in 1996
Bugiri District
Eastern Region, Uganda
Rice
Food manufacturers of Uganda